Timothy is an Australian television comedy which first screened on ABC1 in 2014, as part of "Mental As...", to support Mental Health Week.

Cast
Stephen Curry as Timothy Garrett
Denise Scott as Melinda
Peter Rowsthorn as Colin
 Lisbeth Kennelly as Dr. Sandra Nelson
 John Leary as Mike Schroeder
 Natalie Medlock as Nurse

References

2010s Australian television series
Australian Broadcasting Corporation original programming
Australian comedy television series